In the field of 3D computer graphics, a Render Target is a feature of modern graphics processing units (GPUs) that allows a 3D scene to be rendered to an intermediate memory buffer, or Render Target Texture (RTT), instead of the frame buffer or back buffer.  This RTT can then be manipulated by pixel shaders in order to apply additional effects to the final image before displaying it.

See also
Video post-processing, a generic term for effects applied to an image after it has been rendered.  In real-time applications such as video games, render targets are often used to achieve this.
Framebuffer Object, the OpenGL equivalent

3D rendering